Vaughn Blaney (born August 13, 1938) is a former educator and political figure in New Brunswick, Canada. He represented Queens South and then Oromocto-Gagetown in the Legislative Assembly of New Brunswick from 1987 to 1999 as a Liberal member.

He was born in Saint John, New Brunswick and was educated at the University of Moncton and University of New Brunswick. Blaney was a teacher and principal. He also served as mayor of Gagetown. Blaney was Minister of Municipal Affairs and Environment from 1987 to 1989, Minister of Environment from 1989 to 1991 and from 1995 to 1997, Minister of Advanced Education and Labour from 1991 to 1994, and Minister of Education and Minister of State for Youth from 1994 to 1995.

In August 2005, Blaney was named to head an inquiry into the use of Agent Orange at CFB Gagetown; in October of that year, Blaney resigned, citing health reasons.

References 
 Canadian Parliamentary Guide, 1997, Kathryn O'Handley 

Living people
Mayors of places in New Brunswick
New Brunswick Liberal Association MLAs
Politicians from Saint John, New Brunswick
1938 births